Kostantina Pafiti (born 20 June 1995) is a Cypriot footballer who plays as a defender and has appeared for the Cyprus women's national team.

Career
Pafiti has been capped for the Cyprus national team, appearing for the team during the UEFA Women's Euro 2021 qualifying cycle.

References

External links
 
 
 

1995 births
Living people
Cypriot women's footballers
Cyprus women's international footballers
Women's association football defenders
Apollon Ladies F.C. players